When My Ship Comes In is a 1934 Fleischer Studios animated short film starring Betty Boop.

Plot
After Betty wins $1 million from a horse race/sweepstakes, she daydreams how to best use her funds. She spends it on free servants for the city's people, a huge ice cream mountain for the children of the city, a milk company which delivers milk by attaching milk bottles to balloons, releasing them in the air and onto the doorsteps of the town's citizens, complex gadgets for the animals at her animal farm, a trolley line with recliners and a maids' home next to a bachelors' home. Betty also spends her money to combat the effects of the Great Depression by starting department stores, clothing stores, and reopening factories. By the time she has spent most of her sweepstakes money, the whole country has overcome the Depression.

References

External links
 When My Ship Comes In on  YouTube
 When My Ship Comes In at the Big Cartoon Database
 

1934 films
Betty Boop cartoons
1930s American animated films
American black-and-white films
1934 animated films
Paramount Pictures short films
Fleischer Studios short films
Short films directed by Dave Fleischer